Nikolai Semyonovich Kardashev (25 April 1932 – 3 August 2019) was a Soviet and Russian astrophysicist, Doctor of Physical and Mathematical Sciences, and the deputy director of the Astro Space Center of PN Lebedev Physical Institute of the Russian Academy of Sciences in Moscow.

Early life
He was born in Moscow to a family of professional revolutionaries involved with the Bolshevik Party. His parents were Semyon Karlovich Brike and Nina Nikolaevna Kardasheva; his father was an important member of the party, and his mother joined as well before the October Revolution in 1917. Both of his parents were arrested during the Great Purge of 1937 and 1938. His father was ultimately shot and his mother was assigned to labor camps and would not be released for many years. Due to his parents’ absence, he was sent to an orphanage from which he was then taken by his mother's sister after a great deal of effort. His aunt then died during World War II when he was 16 years old and he then had to live on his own in a large communal flat. His mother was released in 1956, by which time Nikolai had completed university.

Education 
He attended Moscow State University (Russian abbreviation MGU) in the Astronomy division of the Mechanics and Mathematics Department. Here he concentrated his studies/interests in radio astronomy, a topic which was new and developing.

Career 
He joined the Space Research Institute (IKI) of the USSR Academy of Sciences in 1967. He became deputy director of IKI in 1977. During the dissolution of the USSR, Nikolai became the director of the Astro Space Center of the Lebedev Physical Institute. In 1978, Nikolai started a project known as the Space VLBI mission RadioAstron. This mission endured for more than 30 years and a spacecraft was finally launched in 2011. The RadioAstron mission has become important to modern observational astrophysics.

He in 1964 proposed what would be known as the Kardashev scale, the idea of measuring a civilization's degree of technological advancement based on the amount of energy it is able to use. He also proposed Very Long Baseline Interferometry (VLBI), which replaced conventional radio transmission lines with magnetic tape recordings; it was demonstrated in 1967.

He may have predicted the existence of pulsars before they were actually discovered, in his paper ‘Transmission of Information by Extraterrestrial Civilizations'.

Organizations 
He was an active participant of the International Astronomical Union where he was: Vice-President of Executive Committee (1997-2003), Vice-President of Commission 51 Bio-Astronomy (1982-1991), Organizing Committee Member of Commission 40 Radio Astronomy (1967-1985), Member of Division B Facilities, Technologies and Data Science (2019), Member of Division F Planetary Systems and Astrobiology (2019), Member of Commission 40 Radio Astronomy (2015), Member of Commission 51 Bio-Astronomy (2015), Member of Division III Planetary Systems Sciences (2012), Member of Division X Radio Astronomy (2012), and Member of Special Nominating Committee (2000-2003).

He was a member of the USSR Academy of Sciences, Division of General Physics and Astronomy: first as a corresponding (associate) member (12 December 1976), then as a Full Member (21 March 1994), and served as chair of the Russian Academy of Sciences Council on Astronomy from 1999 until his death.

He was a participant of the Committee on Space Research as Vice President from 1982-1986.

Awards and honors 
In 1980 he shared the USSR's State Prize for the development and experiments with the orbital radio telescope KRT-10, and in 1988 he shared the USSR's State Prize for the discovery of Radio Recombination Lines. In 2012, Nikolai received the Grote Reber Gold Medal for innovative lifetime contributions to radio astronomy.

Film career 
His first association with the movie industry was in 1981. He was asked to be a consultant on the set of Petlya Oriona, a Russian television series documentary. He played himself in a TV show episode on the documentary series Space's Deepest Secrets in 2018 as well as playing himself in a TV show episode on the documentary series Horizon in 2018.

Death 
Kardashev died on 3 August 2019 at the age of 87.

Publications 
 
 1963 - "Candidate of Science" dissertation, later promoted to higher level of doctoral thesis.
 1964 - “Transmission of Information by Extraterrestrial Civilizations” which presented a classification of civilizations based on their degree of power consumption spanning 20 orders of magnitude, which became known as the Kardashev Scale.

See also
 Astronomical engineering
 Drake equation
 Search for extraterrestrial intelligence (SETI)
 Planetary civilization
 Orders of magnitude (power)
 Orders of magnitude (energy)
 Technological singularity
 World energy supply and consumption

References

1932 births
2019 deaths
20th-century Russian astronomers
Corresponding Members of the USSR Academy of Sciences
Full Members of the Russian Academy of Sciences
Members of Academia Europaea
Moscow State University alumni
Demidov Prize laureates
Recipients of the Order of Honour (Russia)
Recipients of the USSR State Prize
Radio astronomers
Russian astrophysicists
Russian inventors
Soviet astronomers
Soviet astrophysicists
Interstellar messages
Search for extraterrestrial intelligence
Burials in Troyekurovskoye Cemetery
21st-century Russian astronomers